{{DISPLAYTITLE:C6H9N3}}
The molecular formula C6H9N3 may refer to:

 Ampyzine, a central nervous system stimulant
 IDPN (chemical), a neurotoxin with ototoxic and hepatotoxic effects

Molecular formulas